Francisco Hyun-sol Kim (Korean: 김현솔; born 20 May 1993), commonly known as Chico, is a Brazilian footballer who plays as an attacking midfielder.

Career
Chico was born in Cascavel, Paraná, but was raised in Ciudad del Este, Paraguay, to South Korean parents. In 2008, he went on a trial at Atlético Sorocaba, and subsequently joined the club's youth setup.

Chico joined South Korean club Seoul E-Land on 27 July 2016.

Personal life
Chico holds Paraguayan nationality because he has a Paraguayan father. He acquired South Korean nationality in 2016.

Career statistics

Honours
 Atlético Goianiense
Campeonato Goiano: 2020

References

External links 

1991 births
Living people
People from Cascavel
Brazilian people of South Korean descent
Brazilian people of Paraguayan descent
Chico
South Korean footballers
Association football midfielders
Campeonato Brasileiro Série A players
Campeonato Brasileiro Série B players
Campeonato Brasileiro Série C players
Campeonato Brasileiro Série D players
Clube Atlético Sorocaba players
Esporte Clube Águia Negra players
Brasiliense Futebol Clube players
Olímpia Futebol Clube players
Tupi Football Club players
Clube Atlético Bragantino players
Esporte Clube XV de Novembro (Piracicaba) players
Capivariano Futebol Clube players
Clube de Regatas Brasil players
Ceará Sporting Club players
Mirassol Futebol Clube players
Atlético Clube Goianiense players
Esporte Clube Juventude players
K League 1 players
K League 2 players
Seoul E-Land FC players
Pohang Steelers players
Sportspeople from Paraná (state)